Luquetia lobella is a moth of the family Depressariidae. It is found in most of Europe, except Ireland, the Iberian Peninsula, Finland, Estonia and most of the Balkan Peninsula.

The wingspan is 23–26 mm. Adults are on wing in June.

The larvae feed on blackthorn (Prunus spinosa), hawthorn (Crataegus species) and Sorbus species. They feed from a spinning amongst the leaves, which are rolled downwards. Larvae can be found from mid-July to the beginning of October and are bright green with a white stripe. Pupation takes place in a silken cocoon amongst leaf-litter. The species overwinters in the pupal stage.

References

Depressariinae
Moths described in 1775
Moths of Europe
Taxa named by Michael Denis
Taxa named by Ignaz Schiffermüller